In mathematics, a complex vector bundle is a vector bundle whose fibers are complex vector spaces.

Any complex vector bundle can be viewed as a real vector bundle through the restriction of scalars. Conversely, any real vector bundle E can be promoted to a complex vector bundle, the complexification

whose fibers are Ex ⊗R C.

Any complex vector bundle over a paracompact space admits a hermitian metric.

The basic invariant of a complex vector bundle is a Chern class. A complex vector bundle is canonically oriented; in particular, one can take its Euler class.

A complex vector bundle is a holomorphic vector bundle if X is a complex manifold and if the local trivializations are biholomorphic.

Complex structure 

A complex vector bundle can be thought of as a real vector bundle with an additional structure, the complex structure. By definition, a complex structure is a bundle map between a real vector bundle E and itself:

such that J acts as the square root i of −1 on fibers: if  is the map on fiber-level, then  as a linear map. Conversely, if E is a real vector bundle with a complex structure J, then E can be turned into a complex vector bundle by setting: for any real numbers a, b and a real vector v in a fiber Ex,

Example: A complex structure on the tangent bundle of a real manifold M is usually called an almost complex structure. A theorem of Newlander and Nirenberg says that an almost complex structure J is "integrable" in the sense it is induced by a structure of a complex manifold if and only if a certain tensor involving J vanishes.

Conjugate bundle 

If E is a complex vector bundle, then the conjugate bundle  of E is obtained by having complex numbers acting through the complex conjugates of the numbers. Thus, the identity map of the underlying real vector bundles:  is conjugate-linear, and E and its conjugate  are isomorphic as real vector bundles.

.

If E has a hermitian metric, then the conjugate bundle  is isomorphic to the dual bundle  through the metric, where we wrote  for the trivial complex line bundle.

If E is a real vector bundle, then the underlying real vector bundle of the complexification of E is a direct sum of two copies of E:

(since V⊗RC = V⊕iV for any real vector space V.) If a complex vector bundle E is the complexification of a real vector bundle E, then E is called a real form of E (there may be more than one real form) and E is said to be defined over the real numbers. If E has a real form, then E is isomorphic to its conjugate (since they are both sum of two copies of a real form), and consequently the odd Chern classes of E have order 2.

See also 
Holomorphic vector bundle
K-theory

References 
 

Vector bundles